Laketon may refer to the following places in the U.S. state of Michigan:

 Laketon, Luce County, Michigan, an unincorporated community in Columbus Township
 Laketon Township,  Michigan, in Muskegon County, also a former post office
 A former name of the post office for Bridgman, Michigan, in Berrien County